Lalehzar may refer to:
Lalehzar District, in Kerman Province
Lalehzar Rural District, in Kerman Province
Lalehzar, city
Mount Lalehzar, Kerman Province

See also
 Laleh Zar, village in Ilam Province, Iran